Triple X may refer to:
 Triple X syndrome, a chromosomal abnormality
 Triple X (professional wrestling), a former wrestling stable in Total Nonstop Action Wrestling
 Triple X ESPN Radio, a trio of sports radio stations in the Washington, D.C. area
 Triple X Records, an American record company
 WXXX, a radio station in Vermont known as "95 Triple X"
 Triple X, the code name of ghost prisoner Hiwa Abdul Rahman Rashul
 Triple X, the nickname of XXX Corps (Pakistan) 
 XXXTentacion (1998–2018), American rapper sometimes referred to as "Triple X"
 Arms Corporation, a Japanese animation studio formerly known as Triple X

See also

XXX (disambiguation)
Triplex (disambiguation)